FabricLive.18 is a DJ mix compilation album produced by Andy C and DJ Hype, as part of the FabricLive series. It was released on 18 October 2004 by the Fabric record label. The album is the second in the series to be produced by DJ Hype, who also produced FabricLive.03.

FabricLive.18 is the first collaboration between Andy C and DJ Hype. The first half of the album was mixed by DJ Hype, and includes the previously unreleased track "Submission" from his label Ganja Records, as well as his special edits of "Can You Feel It" and "Comin at Ya". Andy C mixed the second half of the album, which includes the track "Night Vision" by his side project Ram Trilogy.

Track listing
  DJ Friction & K-Tee - The Militia - Shogun Audio - 4:01
  JB - Can You Feel It (DJ Hype Special) - Back 2 Basics - 3:35
  Future Prophecies - Dreadlock - Breakbeat Kaos - 5:02
  D-Type - Slam - Beatz - 3:13
  A Sides (ft. MC Fats) - Bring Dat - True Playaz - 3:36
  The Militia (K-Tee & Nu Balance) - Bad Move - Shogun Audio - 3:14
  2 tracks mixed:
  Andy C & Shimon - Body Rock - Ram
  J Majik & Wickaman - Swallow Ya Soul - Infrared - 3:58
  Potential Bad Boy (ft. Spikey T) - Submission - Ganja Records - 4:30
  J Majik & Wickaman - Spycatcher - Infrared - 3:35
  Krust - Follow Da Vision - Full Cycle - 4:40
  Benny Blanco - Coming At Ya (DJ Hype Special) - Back 2 Basics - 3:13
  J Majik - You Disgust Me - Infrared - 3:33
  Shimon & Moving Fusion - Now's The Time - Ram - 2:21
  Shimon & Moving Fusion - Mysterons - Ram - 1:47
  Ed Rush & Optical - Bacteria (Pendulum Remix) - Breakbeat Kaos/Virus - 2:31
  DJ Fresh - Tomb Raider - Dogs On Acid - 3:08
  Zen - Turnstyle (Baron Remix) - Grid Recordings - 2:09
  Top Buzz - Living In Darkness (Phantasy & Shodan 2004 Remix) - 3:19
  Decorum - Contrax (Weapon Remix) - Liftin' Spirits - 2:30
  Ram Trilogy - Night Vision - Ram - 2:35

Personnel
The following people contributed to FabricLive.18.

Andy C – production, mixing
DJ Hype – mixing
Tony Anthun – production
Jason Ball – production
Damien Burke – production
J Majik – production
MC Fats – production
Potential Bad Boy – production
Matt Quinn – production

Ben Settle – production
Shimon – production
Daniel Sparham – production
Sam Stone – production
Top Buzz – production
Piers Baron Bailey – remixing
Rob Swire – remixing
Weapon – remixing

References

External links
Fabric: FabricLive.18

2004 compilation albums